Maulana Muhammad Abdus Sobhan (19 February 1936 – 14 February 2020) was a Bangladeshi politician. He was a member of the central working committee of the Bangladesh Jamaat-e-Islami. He was a two time elected parliamentarian from Pabna-5 constituency, during the elections of 1991 and 2001 respectively. He went to trial for his relationship with war crimes allegedly committed during the War of Liberation of Bangladesh in 1971.

Early life and education
Abdus Sobhan was born  on 19 February 1936 in the village of Mominpara, Sujanagar thana, Pabna district. His father, Late Munshi Nayeem Uddin Ahmed, was an Islamic scholar. In 1965, he moved with his family to Pathortola, Gopalpur, Pabna city, and has resided there permanently. He enrolled at the Ramchandrapur Maktab. Then he completed his primary education in Manikhaat and Machpara Primary School. In 1941, he enrolled into Ulat Madrassah and studied there till 1947, completing his matriculation. In 1950, he obtained his alim certification. In 1952, he obtained his fazil degree from Sirajganj Alia Madrassah. In 1954, he obtained his kamil degree with distinction from the same madrassah, obtaining 7th position in the first division in the madrassah board.

Career

Teaching
After completion of his fazil studies, he joined Pabna Aliya Madrasah. After that he taught at Gopalchandra institute, Arifpur Ulat Senior Madrassah and Magura Baroria Fazil Madrasah. His teaching career spanned 10 years from 1952 to 1962.

Politics

Abdus Sobhan was active in politics from his student life. He was secretary of Pabna District for East Pakistan Jamiat Talaba Arabiya. In 1951, he joined Jamaat-e-Islami and over time was appointed the Ameer of Pabna District. He was a member of the Central Majlis-e-Shura, the central working committee and the executive committee of Bangladesh Jamaat-e-Islami. He was also a Nayeb-e-Ameer of the party.

Member of Parliament

In 1962 and again in 1965, he was elected as a member of the East Pakistan Constituent Assembly and acted as the senior deputy leader of the opposition in his latter term. He was a member of parliament elected from Pabna-5 constituency in 1991, and deputy leader of the Jamaat's parliamentary group, securing 47.31% of the votes. In 2001, he was again elected as a member of parliament from Pabna-5 constituency as a candidate of 4-party alliance, securing 56.78% of the votes in his constituency. In 1996, he campaigned on a platform to increase women's education.

Arrest and trial
Abdus Sobhan was arrested on 20 September 2012 from Bangabandhu Bridge area while he was traveling from Dhaka to Pabna. Later, he was taken to Pabna to appear before the court that issued the warrant against him in connection with a case filed in 2003.

A day after his arrest he appeared before the International Crimes Tribunal (Bangladesh) in Dhaka on charges of crimes against humanity committed during the Liberation War of Bangladesh in 1971. The International Crimes Tribunal-1 (ICT) framed nine charges of wartime offences against Abdus Sobhan for alleged crimes against humanity in 1971. Sobhan denied the charges brought against him and claimed that he had served as a mole for the Mukti Bahini against Pakistani forces in his time at the Peace Committee.

Death
Sobhan died on 14 February 2020 at Dhaka Medical College Hospital at the age of 83.
Next day 15 February he was buried on Pabna Sadar Arifpur graveyard.

References

Jamaat-e-Islami Pakistan politicians
1936 births
2020 deaths
People from Pabna District
5th Jatiya Sangsad members
8th Jatiya Sangsad members
Bangladeshi Sunni Muslim scholars of Islam
People from Sujanagar Upazila